Jeanne Belhomme (d. fl. 1745), was a French actress and theatre director. She was the director of the La Monnaie in Brussels from 1743 to 1745. She shared the position jointly with Charles Plante.

Jeanne Belhomme was commonly known simply as "Demoiselle Belhomme". She was initially engaged as an actress at the La Monnaie. During the 1730s, she was listed with a salary of $800, which placed her among the elite of the actors of the theater. When the director Joseph Uriot resigned in 1743, she resumed the position of director and manager of the theater La Monnaie in partnership with her colleague, Charles Plante. This was an unstable period in the history of the theater, and few directors managed to handle the post very long. In 1745, Belhomme and Plante resigned their co-directorship to Nicolini.

References
 Isnardon. Jacques: Le théâtre de la Monnaie : depuis sa fondation jusqu'à nos jours" (1890)

Directors of La Monnaie
French theatre directors
Actors of the Austrian Netherlands
Year of birth missing
Year of death missing
18th-century French women
18th-century French people
18th-century theatre managers
Women of the Austrian Netherlands